The 1993 West Virginia Mountaineers football team completed the regular season with an 11–0 (7–0 conference record) and won the school's first Big East Conference championship in what was the first year of round robin play for the conference. The team traveled to the Sugar Bowl, where they lost to the Florida Gators, 41–7. WVU finished the season 11–1.

Schedule

Season summary
The 1993 season began with an uncertainty at quarterback. Both Darren Studstill and Jake Kelchner were up for the spot, but coach Don Nehlen decided to have a rotation each game while playing freshman Chad Johnston a few games. Star running back Adrian Murrell was replaced that season by Robert Walker and All-American center Mike Compton was replaced by Dale Williams. Tackle Rich Braham provided help to Walker in the run game. Young Aaron Beasley and Mike Logan led the secondary.

The first game against Eastern Michigan University was an easy win. The next was against the University of Maryland. Kelchner passed for 270 yards and Harold Kidd grabbed a big interception to seal the win, 42–37. The next week, the Mountaineers blew by the University of Missouri 35–3 in Morgantown. In that game, Mike Collins returned a fumble 97 yards for a score and Vann Washington took an interception 27-yards for another score.

The next week was a close win against Virginia Tech, 14–13. The Mountaineers won, even though turning the ball over five times, when the Tech kicker missed a 44-yard field goal. The next game was against the University of Louisville, one of the toughest games of the season. Led by Brian Brohm's older brother, Jeff Brohm, the Cardinals were undefeated like the Mountaineers. But Robert Walker score three times, and led the Mountaineers to a close 36–34 win. The win led the Mountaineers into the Top 15 in the country. The next game, against the University of Pittsburgh, had a close first quarter. But Robert Walker rushed for over 150 yards and Mike Baker caught a couple of touchdown passes to pull away and win, 42–21.

The next game was a revengeful game. In 1992, West Virginia played the University of Syracuse, when a massive fight occurred. In a controversial decision, three Mountaineers were ejected, while only one Orangeman was ejected. That led to the Syracuse win. In the '93 version of the game, after missing two field goals, the Mountaineers were up 7–0 at halftime. But in the second half, the Mountaineer exploded. After a 90-yard run by Robert Walker, the Mountaineers won 43–0.

After beating Rutgers and Temple University, the Mountaineers were 9–0. In one of the biggest games in Mountaineer history, the #4 University of Miami came to Morgantown and played before a record Mountaineer Field crowd of 70,222, a mark that still stands today. The game was close, but Robert Walker won the game when he took a run to the sideline in the fourth quarter. Up 17–14, with four minutes left, Jake Kelchner threw a 40-yard bomb to seal the game.

After the game, Jake Kelchner injured his arm and Vann Washington had leg problems. The next game was against Boston College, who was coming off an upset win of their own over then #1 Notre Dame, the Mountaineers were almost taken by surprise. Down 11 points with 13 minutes left, Don Nehlen told defensive coordinator Steve Dunlap to put in Keith Jones and Mike Logan. The next play, Jones hit the fullback, resulting in a fumble which was recovered by the Mountaineers. Darren Studstill drove 63-yards downfield, and hit Eddie Hill for one of the greatest scores in West Virginia history. West Virginia finished the season 11–0, their second undefeated season.

Sugar Bowl
Although the Mountaineers finished the season as one of only two undefeated and untied teams eligible for a bowl game, alongside Coaches' Poll #1 Nebraska, they were denied a chance to play in the Orange Bowl, that year's de facto national championship game. Auburn was also undefeated but was on probation. West Virginia finished second in the final regular-season Coaches' Poll, but was only third in the final regular-season AP Poll behind #2 Nebraska and #1 Florida State. The margin between Florida State and West Virginia was large enough to drop the Mountaineers to third in the "Bowl Poll," a combination of the points from both polls which the Bowl Coalition used to set bowl matchups.

Instead, West Virginia was scheduled to play the Florida Gators in the Sugar Bowl. After an 80-yard drive that led to a touchdown pass, the Mountaineers then stopped the Gators on their first drive. The next Gator drive almost went three-and-out, until a personal foul on Steve Perkins gave Florida the momentum. Jake Kelchner was playing a good game, but then Nehlen surprised many by putting Studstill in. On the Mountaineers' first drive, Studstill threw an interception that the Gators returned for a touchdown. Florida ran off with the game after that, winning 41–7, ending any claim West Virginia might have had at a national championship. Florida State beat the same Florida team on the road by a 33-21 score.

Coach Don Nehlen said of the game, "We had wanted to play Nebraska in the Orange Bowl as the only two undefeated teams, but the Bowl Coalition didn't like the match. Instead, we were slotted to play Texas A&M in the Cotton Bowl Classic. Instead, the Sugar Bowl paid more money so the conference and administration wanted us to play Florida.  If we wanted the best chance to win, we should have taken the Cotton; playing a slower, more physical team outdoors would have worked to our advantage a lot more than playing those Florida speed-burners indoors on a smooth surface."

Roster

Team players in the NFL

References

West Virginia
1993
Big East Conference football champion seasons
Lambert-Meadowlands Trophy seasons
West Virginia Mountaineers football